Sagdalen Station is a railway station on the Trunk Line in Skedsmo, Norway. It is served by the Oslo Commuter Rail line L1 operated by Vy running from Lillestrøm via Oslo S to Spikkestad. The station was opened in 1938.

The station is located beside the former railway factory Strømmens Værksted.

External links
Jernbaneverket's entry on Sagdalen station

Railway stations in Skedsmo
Railway stations on the Trunk Line
Railway stations opened in 1938
1938 establishments in Norway